Suzi Lovegrove (1955–1987) was an HIV-positive American-born woman whose battle with AIDS was chronicled in a landmark television documentary made at her request, entitled Suzi's Story, which premiered on Australian television in 1987. Her son Troy contracted the virus while still in the womb, and died at the age of 7 on 3 June 1993.

Suzi Lovegrove was originally an actress known as Suzi Sidewinder. In 1983, she had a small part in the film Get Crazy, playing a member of Nada's band (Nada was played by Suzi's friend Lori Eastside, who later appeared briefly in Suzi's Story).  It was while promoting this movie, on a flight between the U.S. and Australia, where she met future husband Vince Lovegrove. Vince had been the lead singer of The Valentines in the 1960s and later went on to manage Divinyls and Jimmy Barnes.

References

External links

 AIDS Council of NSW

1955 births
1987 deaths
Australian film actresses
AIDS-related deaths in Australia
20th-century Australian actresses